Lakshmi Kalyanam is a 1968 Indian Tamil-language film, directed by G. Or. Nathan and produced by A. L. Srinivasan. The film stars Sivaji Ganesan, Sowcar Janaki, Vennira Aadai Nirmala, K. Balaji and M. N. Nambiar. It was released on 15 November 1968. The film was remade in Telugu as Pelli Koothuru (1970).

Plot 
As the title suggests, the story is about the efforts Kathirvel and his father, Egambaram, go through to solemnize the marriage of Lakshmi to whom they act as guardian and is daughter of a single mother Parvathi. Trouble comes in the form of constant influx of people and circumstances ruining their attempts including that of the old lecherous Suruttu who wants to marry her; Maragatham who wants Lakshmi to marry her idiot son Gnanapalam; V.S Raghavan who first agrees and reneges for the marriage of Lakshmi with his son among others. 

It is compounded by the fact that Parvathi's husband and Lakshmi's father, Ragunathan, is a fugitive from justice thereby not allowing Parvathi to reveal who or where her husband is not wanting to cause more trouble to the possibility of her daughter's marriage.

Cast 
Sivaji Ganesan as Kathirvel
Sowcar Janaki as Parvathi
Vennira Aadai Nirmala as Lakshmi
K. Balaji as Ramu
M. N. Nambiar as Suruttu Sundaram Pillai
Major Sundarrajan as Ragunathan
V. K. Ramasamy as Egambaram
V. S. Raghavan as Rajankam
S. V. Ramadas as Rajadurai
V. Gopalakrishnan as Balu
Cho as Seenu
A. Karunanidhi as Ganesan Pillai
C. K. Saraswathi as Maragatham
S. N. Lakshmi as Rajadurai's mother
Shanmugasundari as Balu's mother
P. D. Sambandam as Iyer
S. Ramarao as Neelakanda Sastri
 Shanmuga Sundaram as Police Sub-Inspector
 "Periyar" Rajavel as Police Inspector

Soundtrack 
The music was composed by M. S. Viswanathan, with lyrics by Kannadasan. The song "Raman Ethanai" is set in Sindhu Bhairavi raga, and symbolises "the role of Ram in the popular imagination and in the arts, endlessly fascinating poets, dancers, musicians, scholars and filmmakers". "Brindavanathukku", like many other songs by Kannadasan, extols Krishna.

Release and reception 
Lakshmi Kalyanam was released on 15 November 1968. The film won the Filmfare Award for Best Film – Tamil, and four Tamil Nadu State Film Awards: Best Music Director (Viswanathan), Best Male Playback Singer (Soundararajan), Best Female Playback Singer (Susheela) and  Best Lyricist (Kannadasan).

References

External links 
 

1960s Tamil-language films
1968 films
Films scored by M. S. Viswanathan
Tamil films remade in other languages